The Leopard Man is a 1943 American horror film directed by Jacques Tourneur, and starring Dennis O'Keefe, Jean Brooks, and Margo. Based on the book Black Alibi by Cornell Woolrich, it follows a series of violent murders in a small New Mexico town, which coincide with the escape of a leopard from a nightclub.

It is one of the first American films to attempt an even remotely realistic portrayal of a serial killer (although that term was yet to be used).

Plot
In a sleepy New Mexico town, nightclub promoter Jerry Manning hires a black leopard as a publicity stunt for his girlfriend, Kiki Walker, a performer there. Kiki uses the opportunity to interrupt the act of her rival, Clo-Clo, by storming into the restaurant with the leopard on a leash. Angered, Clo-Clo frightens the leopard with her castanets, and it escapes, fleeing into the night. Charlie, the Native American owner of the leopard who leased it to Jerry, begins pestering him for money to replace the cat.

That night, a young local woman, Teresa, goes to purchase corn meal for her family's dinner. Under a bridge in an arroyo, she encounters the leopard, and flees to her house. She is killed at the door just before her family is able to let her back in the house. The medical examiner rules Teresa's death an accident, concluding she was mauled by the leopard. Shortly after, Consuela, another local, goes to visit her father's grave in the cemetery on her birthday. Lost in thought, Consuela fails to leave before the gatekeeper locks the gate, and finds herself trapped within the cemetery's stone walls. When help arrives, Consuela is found, another apparent victim of the leopard.

After learning of the second murder, Jerry inquires to the police as to why the leopard has remained within the city, as he was informed it would naturally flee to the wilderness. Charlie also questions whether the leopard killed Consuela, but is goaded by the local historian and museum curator Galbraith, into believing he may be responsible, committing the murders during his nightly alcohol binges in which he blacks out. At his request, Charlie is kept in a jail cell overnight. Clo-Clo spends the night with an elderly wealthy man at the nightclub, who gifts her a hundred-dollar bill. After, she visits Maria, a fortune teller, who warns her that "something black" is coming to claim her. En route home, Clo-Clo loses the hundred-dollar bill. When she goes back out to find it, she is attacked and murdered.

Kiki and Jerry prepare to leave on a trip to Chicago, coinciding with an annual procession that occurs in the town, commemorating the mass murder of the Natives by the Conquistadors. As they depart for their train, Kiki and Jerry are gifted a bouquet of flowers from Galbraith, which Kiki wishes to place on Consuela's grave before they leave town. At the cemetery, they are met by Charlie, who notifies them his leopard has been found shot dead in the arroyo, and its fur taken; he presumes the cat has been dead for at least a week, suggesting a human may be responsible for the murders. Charlie recalls having seen Galbraith in the area, and suspects he killed the leopard. Jerry attempts to turn Galbraith in to the police, but they do not believe him.

During the procession that night, Galbraith hears a woman's scream at the cemetery. He subsequently enters the museum, where he hears the sound of the castanets echoing. Shortly after, Kiki arrives at the museum, where she offers to accompany Galbraith in viewing the procession. She convinces Galbraith to turn off the lights, remarking they will better be able to watch the procession. Galbraith agrees and, once the lights are off, Kiki drops a pair of castanets. Galbraith attacks her, but she is saved by Jerry. Galbraith flees into the street, where he is eventually stopped amongst the procession marchers. Confronted by Jerry and Raoul, Consuela's fiancé, Galbraith confesses to having murdered both Consuelo and Clo-Clo. He admits to having been inspired to do so after witnessing the leopard maul Teresa to death. Seeking vengeance, Raoul shoots Galbraith to death.

Later, while at the funeral parlor, Jerry and Kiki reaffirm their love for one another.

Cast

Critical reaction

Initial response
Upon its initial theatrical release, The Leopard Man received mixed reviews. 
In their 1943 review of the film, Bosley Crowther of The New York Times called the film "Half-baked", and wrote, "The Leopard Man is nothing but a feeble and obvious attempt to frighten and shock the audience with a few exercises in mayhem."

Reassessment
In the subsequent years, following the film's release, modern critical response has been mostly positive, with many critics praising the film's atmosphere, direction, and suspense.

Ed Gonzalez of Slant Magazine awarded the film four out of four stars, praising Tourneur's use of sound and shadows to create tension. Dennis Schwartz of Ozus' World Movie Reviews rated the film a grade A, writing, "Tourneur's fast-paced film is armed with a taut and intelligent script, and is one of those memorable films that gets even better with age like a good wine."

Legacy
The Leopard Man has gradually acquired a cult following over the years, and is now considered a cult classic. It has been included in multiple lists at various media publications as one of the greatest horror films ever made. Indiewire placed it at No. 90 in their "The 100 Greatest Horror Movies of All-Time". Slant Magazine listed it at number 30 in their "The 100 Best Horror Movies of All Time".

References

Further reading

External links

 
 
 
 
 
 Screenplay for film by Ardel Wray and Edward Dein

1943 films
1943 horror films
1940s serial killer films
American horror films
American black-and-white films
1940s English-language films
Films scored by Roy Webb
Films based on American novels
Films based on works by Cornell Woolrich
Films directed by Jacques Tourneur
Films produced by Val Lewton
Films set in New Mexico
American serial killer films
Publicity stunts in fiction
RKO Pictures films
American exploitation films
1940s American films